Marla Adams (born August 28, 1938) is an American television actress, best known for her roles as Belle Clemens on The Secret Storm, from 1968 to 1974, and as Dina Abbott Mergeron on The Young and the Restless, for which she received Daytime Emmy Award for Outstanding Supporting Actress in a Drama Series.

Life and career
Adams was born in Ocean City, New Jersey and began her career on stage. She attended American Academy of Dramatic Arts. Adams appeared on Broadway in the 1958 production of The Visit at the Morosco Theatre with Alfred Lunt and Lynn Fontanne. She later made her film debut, appearing opposite Natalie Wood in the period drama Splendor in the Grass (1961). Her other film credits including Special Delivery (1976) and Gotcha! (1985).

Adams is best known for her daytime soap opera roles. She starred as Belle Clemens on The Secret Storm from 1968 to 1974. As Belle Clemens, she was the show's reigning villainess for the last years of its run, stopping at almost nothing to destroy the life of the show's leading heroine, Amy Ames. The two rivals were, at one time, related through marriage. In 1983, she began playing Dina Abbott Mergeron on The Young and the Restless. As Dina Abbott on The Young and the Restless from 1983–86, in 1991 and again in 1996, she caused major disruptions in the lives of her three children and ex-husband John Abbott and his wife Jill. She reprised her role as Dina for three episodes on The Young and the Restless in 2008 when Katharine Chancellor was presumed dead. In May 2017, Adams returned to her role. The following March, Adams' performance garnered her first Emmy Nomination for Best Supporting Actress. In October 2020, it was announced that she would exit the role. Adams won the Daytime Emmy Award for Outstanding Supporting Actress in a Drama Series, after her second nomination, on Friday June 25, 2021.

Right before joining The Young and the Restless, Adams stepped into the role of the scheming Myrna Clegg, on the defunct daytime drama Capitol after the departure of actress Carolyn Jones who had left for health reasons, prior to Marj Dusay, who remained until the end of the show's run. As Helen Mullin on Generations, she was involved in a storyline involving racism, although it was her character's husband, Charles, who was the racist even though he was revealed to have a black mistress. She was the third actress to play Beth Logan, mother of Brooke (Katherine Kelly Lang), Donna (Carrie Mitchum, now Jennifer Gareis), and Katie(Nancy Sloan, now Heather Tom) on The Bold and the Beautiful (1991). In 1999, she appeared on Days of Our Lives as snooty Dr. Claire McIntyre.

In addition to her daytime works, Adams has made more than 40 appearances on primetime television. She guest-starred on The New Dick Van Dyke Show; Adam-12; Starsky and Hutch; Marcus Welby, M.D.; Phyllis; The Streets of San Francisco; Emergency!; The Love Boat; Barnaby Jones; Hart to Hart; Happy Days; Hill Street Blues; Who's the Boss?; Matlock; and Columbo. She also had a recurring role on Walker, Texas Ranger from 2000 to 2001. In 2000, she played first lady in the television film The President's Man, starring Chuck Norris and Dylan Neal.

Selected filmography

References

External links
 
 
 Marla Adams(Aveleyman)

1938 births
American film actresses
American soap opera actresses
Daytime Emmy Award winners
Daytime Emmy Award for Outstanding Supporting Actress in a Drama Series winners
20th-century American actresses
Living people
Actresses from New Jersey
People from Ocean City, New Jersey
21st-century American women
American Academy of Dramatic Arts alumni